Halomonas desiderata is an alkaliphilic, halotolerant and denitrifying bacterium first isolated from a municipal sewage works.

References

Further reading

Mata, Juan Antonio, et al. "A Detailed Phenotypic Characterisation of the Type Strains of Halomonas Species." Systematic and Applied Microbiology25.3 (2002): 360–375.
Dworkin, Martin, and Stanley Falkow, eds. The Prokaryotes: Vol. 6: Proteobacteria: Gamma Subclass. Vol. 6. Springer, 2006.

External links

Type strain of Halomonas desiderata at BacDive -  the Bacterial Diversity Metadatabase

Oceanospirillales
Bacteria described in 1997